Fury/Black Widow: Death Duty is a graphic novel published by Marvel Comics in 1995.

Publication history
The book was published in 1995 in America. It was the character Night Raven's first appearance outside on Marvel UK.

Plot
Black Widow returns to Russia to see if her homeland had really changed since she left. When a diplomat is found murdered on the grounds of the United States Embassy, Nick Fury and S.H.I.E.L.D. are drawn into an international crisis that pits secret agents against the Russian mafia. Into this conflict enters The Black Widow, now as a full-time Avenger as well as Russia's most famous expatriate, and Night Raven. His bloody one-man war against crime is just a pastime; his real obsession is to kill one person, Yi Yang, the woman who made him immortal.

Reception
Win Wiacek of Now Read This stated "Superbly illustrated by Charlie Adlard, this is nonetheless an uncomfortable blending of genres, with a strange pace to it: almost as if there’s been some savage trimming and pruning with no thought to narrative cohesion." The book was ranked sixth on Diamonds highest selling paperbacks in February 1995.

See also
 1995 in comics

References

External links

Black Widow (Marvel Comics)
Nick Fury titles
1995 graphic novels
Marvel Comics graphic novels